Baetov (until 1980 Dyurbeldzhin) is a village and a center of Ak-Talaa District in Naryn Region of Kyrgyzstan. Its population was 10,682 in 2021. It lies on the Naryn valley road about half-way from Naryn to Kazarman.  At this point, a road branches south to Baetov on an outwash plain in the mountains.  A jeep road goes south over a 3,268m pass to the At-Bashy valley and A365 to the Torugart Pass.

Population

References

Populated places in Naryn Region